Fan Girl may refer to:
 Fan Girl (2015 film), an American teen comedy film
 Fan Girl (2020 film), a Philippine coming-of-age film

See also
 Fangirl
 Fangirl (novel), a 2013 novel by Rainbow Rowell
 Fangirls (musical), an Australian stage musical